The 1946 Denver Pioneers football team was an American football team that represented the University of Denver as member of the Mountain States Conference (MSC) during the 1946 college football season. In their sixth season under head coach Cac Hubbard, the Pioneers compiled a 5–5–1 record (4–1–1 against conference opponents), shared the MSC title with Utah State, and were outscored by a total of 182 to 179. They played in the 1947 Alamo Bowl, losing by at 20–0 score to Hardin–Simmons.

Three Denver players were selected by the International News Service as first-team players on the 1946 All-Mountain States football team: Bob Hazelhurst at back; Gregg Browning at end; and George MIller at tackle. End Jordan and back Karamagios were named to the second team.

Schedule

After the season

The 1947 NFL Draft was held on December 16, 1946. The following Pioneers were selected.

References

Denver
Denver Pioneers football seasons
Mountain States Conference football champion seasons
Denver Pioneers football